Night is a 2008 Australian documentary film, co-produced and directed by Lawrence Johnston.

Synopsis
Scenes of Australia filmed at night.

Critical response
 
Leigh Paatsch from Herald Sun gave the film three and a half out of five stars saying that while "the whole package is occasionally too pretentious and pretty for its own good" there were "moments of sublime contemplation captured throughout Night that are rarely (if ever) felt in an Australian film."
 
The Sunday Age's Tom Ryan also gave the film three and a half out of five stars. He writes "If Johnston's ambitious work sometimes gets a bit pompous, it also displays, along with the striking cinematography, a keen anthropological instinct and a real intelligence."

The Courier Mail's Des Partridge gave it three out of five stars closing his review by saying "At only 82 minutes including credits, Night scrapes in as a feature, and the repetitive film seems longer."

Writing in the Daily Telegraph, Tracey Prisk gave it three out of five stars, calling it a "visual fest" but stating "it's hard to imagine that Night will have such resonance on the big screen."
 
Simon Weaving from the Canberra Times notes that "the film as a whole is a flawed curiosity rather than a stunning piece."

Accolades
Cezary Skubiszewski's soundtrack won the 2008 Screen Music Award for Best Music for a Documentary and was nominated for the 2008 AIRA Award for Best Original Soundtrack/Cast/Show Album and the 2009 International Film Music Critics Award for Best Original Score for a Documentary Film.

References

External links
 

2008 films
2008 documentary films
2000s English-language films
Australian documentary films